Magomed Kurugliyev (born 16 January 1974 in Dagestan) is a Lezgin from Dagestan. He is a citizen of Kazakhstan. He was a wrestler who competed in the 1996 Summer Olympics, in the 2000 Summer Olympics, and in the 2004 Summer Olympics.

He won a bronze medal at the 2005 World Wrestling Championships. Other notable achievements include bronze medals at the 1998 Asian Games and 2006 Asian Games, as well as a silver medal at the 2002 Asian Games.

References

1974 births
Living people
People from Dagestan
Kazakhstani people of Dagestani descent
Olympic wrestlers of Kazakhstan
Wrestlers at the 1996 Summer Olympics
Wrestlers at the 2000 Summer Olympics
Kazakhstani male sport wrestlers
Wrestlers at the 2004 Summer Olympics
Asian Games medalists in wrestling
Wrestlers at the 1998 Asian Games
Wrestlers at the 2002 Asian Games
Wrestlers at the 2006 Asian Games
Medalists at the 1998 Asian Games
Medalists at the 2002 Asian Games
Medalists at the 2006 Asian Games
Asian Games silver medalists for Kazakhstan
Asian Games bronze medalists for Kazakhstan